Far Away from Conformity is the second full-length album from Cadaveria. The album was recorded at the Capitan Woofer Studios of Saluggia (Vercelli, Italy).

Track listing

Personnel
 Killer Bob – bass
 Frank Booth –  guitar
 Cadaveria –  vocals
 Marcelo Santos (aka Flegias) – drums

References

Far Away From Conformity
Cadaveria albums
Scarlet Records albums